John Bisley (fl. 1406–1421) was an English politician.

He was a Member (MP) of the Parliament of England for Gloucester between 1406 and 1421.

References

People from Gloucester
Members of the Parliament of England (pre-1707) for Gloucester
14th-century births
15th-century deaths
15th-century English people